The Alliance of the Orders of Saint John of Jerusalem is a federation of European (mostly Protestant) chivalric orders that share inheritance of the tradition of the medieval military Knights Hospitaller (Order of Knights of the Hospital of Saint John of Jerusalem).

History
The Alliance was formed in 1961 to encourage closer collaboration between its member orders in matters of common concern, and comprises:

The Johanniterorden (Balley Brandenburg des Ritterlichen Ordens Sankt Johannis vom Spital zu Jerusalem, or the "Bailiwick of Brandenburg of the Chivalric Order of Saint John of the Hospital of Jerusalem"), based in Germany, as well as the non-German commanderies affiliated with the Bailiwick of Brandenburg, of which four have an autonomous status:
 the Johanniter Ridderskapet i Finland, based in Finland,
 the Association des Chevaliers de St. Jean, based in France,
 the Kommende der Johanniterritter in der Schweiz, based in Switzerland, and
 the Johannita Rend Magyar Tagozata, based in Hungary.
 The Johanniter Orde in Nederland, based in The Netherlands. 
 The Johanniterorden i Sverige, based in Stockholm, Sweden. 
 The Most Venerable Order of the Hospital of St John of Jerusalem, based in the United Kingdom.

The Johanniter Orde in Nederland and the Johanniterorden i Sverige were formerly commanderies of the Bailiwick of Brandenburg. They became independent orders under the respective monarchs in 1946.

As John Brooke-Little (when Norroy and Ulster King of Arms) later put into writing,  the principal impetus for the concordat of 1961 was not ecumenism or brotherhood: it was signed because none of the few remaining legitimate orders of Saint John could effectively shield themselves from the claims of the self-styled orders while the legitimate orders continuously debated among themselves which of them was legitimate. This concordat led to the establishment of the Alliance of the Orders of St. John.

The presidency of the Alliance rotates between the four Orders of Saint John.

The mutually-recognised Orders of Saint John
The four non-Catholic constituent orders of the Alliance, together with the Roman Catholic Sovereign Military Order of Malta (SMOM), form the "Mutually Recognised Orders of Saint John": SMOM is acknowledged as being the senior order, with the other Alliance members stemming from the same root. 

This alliance has evolved over time to the point where co-operation between the respective Orders is now ever closer: a representative of the Johanniterorden, for instance, sits on the board of the St John Eye Hospital Group.

The Committee on the Orders of Saint John

None of the five mutually-recognised orders accept the claims of any other so-called Order of Saint John (which SMOM, the Alliance Orders and others describe as "self-styled"), nor their claims to be successors of the medieval Order of Saint John, nor any right to use the name and symbols of that order. 

In 1975, the Alliance Orders, together with the Sovereign Military Order of Malta, established what is today known as the Committee on the Orders of Saint John, a collaborative body focused on protecting their shared heritage, including names and symbols.  For many years the president of the Committee was Friedrich Wilhelm, Prince of Hohenzollern (1924-2010), and more recently Lt. Col. Peregrine Bertie, brother of the former Grand Master of SMOM, Fra' Andrew Bertie (1929-2008).  The current president is Fra' John T. Dunlap.

See also
Johanniter International, a network of charities affiliated with the Alliance Orders

References

Further reading

External links
Official website
www.saintjohn.org

 
Organizations established in 1961